Sangeet Natak in Marathi language literally means Musical Drama. As the name suggests, this form of drama combines prose as well as poetry in form of songs to convey the story. In a manner, they are very much similar to Musicals. Sangeet Natakas played a vital role in the development of Marathi theater and thus the Marathi cinema as well as Indian film industry. Sangeet Natak start with praise of Lord Natraja which is called as Naandi or Mangalaacharan or Suchakpad usually the famous one "Panchatunda Nararundamaldhar" from Sangeet Shakuntal. They are popular for use of Indian classical music. The "Dramatic Music" is called Natya Sangeet, one of the two popular forms of vocal arts in Maharashtra and surrounding states. The other is Bhavageet.

History

The beginning
Vishnudas Bhave is considered the founder of Marathi theater. In 1843, his group staged  the first public performance of  Marathi play Seeta Swayamvar (सीता स्वयं‍वर). The integration of music in the dramas took place quite late in 1879 when play writer and producer Trilokekar presented his musical play Nal-Damayanti (नल-दमयंती). It was the first musical play on Marathi stage.

But only when Balwant Pandurang Kirloskar (popularly known as Annasaheb Kirloskar) staged his first musical play Shaakuntal, based on Kalidas's play Abhijñānaśākuntalam, on October 31, 1880 in Pune did the trend of Sangeet Natak really start.  Kirloskar included 209 musical pieces in his Shaakuntal of 7 acts. They consisted of a mix of Hindustani and Carnatic classical music, and lighter music.

During its early period, Sangeet natak was dominated by religious plays like Sangeet Saubhdra, which is legend in Marathi sangeet natak. The trend changed with coming of sangeet Manapman, which depicts bravery of its hero Dheryadhar and his love with Bhamini which was written by Krushnaji Prabhakar Khadilkar.

Golden age
The new trend of Sangeet Natakas caught up with the popularity quite quickly. With British Raj then existing in India, Sangeet Natakas were compared with the Operas and thus local Marathi Indians found synonymous recreation. In the blooming times, Sangeet Natakas were mainly based on mythological stories of Mahabharata or Ramayana which would hence easily connect with the masses. They did not cover the complete epics but were limited to only small stories in them.

With popularity & success, experimentation started on stage with abandoning mythological themes and bringing social issues to audiences. Sangeet Sharada, for example, by portraying the feelings of a teenage girl to be married to a widower in his late seventies, brought out a social message. Few dramas, like Kichak Vadh, even agitated the British rulers to the extent that they were banned. Kichak Vadh compared the Britishers with Kichak, an evil character from Mahabharata who tried to dishonour Draupadi. Draupadi was then synonymous with the oppressed common Indian masses.

During the 1960s, another turn came in natya sangeet with the emergence of Jitendra Abhisheki, who was credited with applying simplicity to the complex composition of Natya Sangeet.

Plays
The recent play Katyar Kaljat Ghusli by Zee studios opened up a new era of musical cinemas. This movie was based  on the legendary play bearing the same name. Its music was composed by Jitendra Abhisekhi and sung by Vasantrao Deshpande.

Notable contributions
Annasaheb Kirloskar who founded the Sangeet Natakas also offered other famous plays like Sangeet Saubhadra and Ramrajyaviyog.

Bal Gandharva's Gandharva Natak Mandali; Vasudeorao Dongre's Dongre Mandali; Pandoba Gurav Yavateshwarkar's Waikar Sangeet Mandali; Janubhau Nimkar and Keshavrao Bhosale's Swadesh-Hita-Chintak Mandali, which evolved into Lalit-Kaladarsha Mandali; and Master Dinanath's Balwant Natak Mandali were the other main performing companies which were formed in Maharashtra.

Jaymala Shiledar (1926-2013) - Jaymala, her husband Jayaram Shiledar and daughters, Kirti and Lata kept Sangeet natak alive during the lean period of 1960s to 1990s. They staged 25 new musicals, including 'Ekhadyacha Nashib', Mumbaichi Manasa', 'Anantphandi', and Abhogi through their company, Marathi Rangabhoomi. She was a protege of Bal Gandharva.

Natya Sangeet Maestro

 Bal Gandharva
 Keshavrao Bhosale
 Deenanath Mangeshkar
 Master Krishnarao
 Pandit Ram Marathe
 Saudagar Nagnath Gore
 Prasad Sawkar
 Bhalchandra Pendharkar
 Ramdas Kamat
 Vasantrao Deshpande
 Jitendra Abhisheki
 Jaymala Shiledar
 Jyotsna Bhole
 Manik Varma

List of famous Sangeet Nataks
To attract the audiences, many of the Sangeet Nataks used to prefix the word Sangeet before their actual name.
 Sita Swayamvar
 Shaakuntal
 Sangeet Saubhadra
 Sangeet Maanaapmaan
 Matsyagandha
 Sanyastkhadga
 Kichak Vadh
 Ramrajyaviyog
 Mruchhakatik (1889)
 Sangeet Sanshaykallol
 Katyar Kaljat Ghusli (1967)
 Shapsambhram (1893)
 Sangeet Sharada (1899)
 Sangeet Swayamvar (1916)
 Ghashiram Kotwal
 Devmaanus
 He Bandha Reshmache
 Moruchi Mavshi
 Mandarmala
 Geeta Gati Dnyaneshwar
 Suwarnatula
 Sangeet Vidyaharan
 Ekach Pyaala
 Bhavbandhan
 Madanachi Manjiri
 Punya Prabhav

See also

 Bhavageet
 Natya Sangeet
 Musical theatre
 Opera

Further reading
 Marathi book by Govindrao Tembe "माझा संगीत व्यासंग" (My Study of Music); published 1939

References

Reading list
 
 Book in Marathi by Govindrao Tembe "माझा संगीत व्यासंग" (My Study of Music) 1939

External links
Kamat.com - Marathi Natya Sangeet

 
Theatre in India
Musical theatre
Marathi music
Culture of Maharashtra
Marathi theatre
Hindustani music